Ivan Krajčírik (born 15 June 2000) is a Slovak professional footballer who plays for Ružomberok as a goalkeeper.

Club career

MFK Ružomberok
Krajčírik made his Fortuna Liga debut for Ružomberok against ViOn Zlaté Moravce on 14 October 2017.

International career
Krajčírik was first recognised in a senior national team nomination on 23 May 2022 Štefan Tarkovič  as an alternate ahead of four UEFA Nations League fixtures against Belarus, Azerbaijan and Kazakhstan. For the same June fixtures, he was also a member of U21 team ahead of a qualifier against Malta and a friendly against Romania.

References

External links
 MFK Ružomberok official profile
 Futbalnet profile
 
 Ligy.sk profile

2000 births
Living people
People from Handlová
Sportspeople from the Trenčín Region
Slovak footballers
Slovakia youth international footballers
Slovakia under-21 international footballers
Association football goalkeepers
MFK Ružomberok players
4. Liga (Slovakia) players
3. Liga (Slovakia) players
2. Liga (Slovakia) players
Slovak Super Liga players